Events from the year 1460 in Ireland.

Incumbent
Lord: Henry VI

Events
Richard Duke of York, Lord Lieutenant of Ireland, returns to England.
Ireland’s legislative independence is declared.

Births

Deaths

References

 
1460s in Ireland
Ireland
Years of the 15th century in Ireland